In Search of Nic Jones is an album by Nic Jones, released in 1998. It is a collection of remastered live recordings, performed between 1979 and 1982. The album was voted Mojo's Folk Album of the Month, August 1998.

Track listing
"Seven Yellow Gypsies" (Traditional(Child #200, Roud #1)/Arr. Nic Jones) 3:17
"Texas Girl At The Funeral Of Her Father" (Randy Newman) 2:52
"Lord Franklin" (Traditional(Roud #487)/Arr. Nic Jones) 4:22
"Swimming Song" (Loudon Wainwright III) 2:54
"Ploughman Lads" (John Wilson(Roud #3448)) 3:13
"Ruins By The Shore" (Nic Jones) 3:51
"On Board The Kangaroo" (Traditional(Roud #925)/Arr. Nic Jones) 3:14
"Hardiman The Fiddler" (Traditional/Arr. Nic Jones) 1:34
"Green To Grey" (Nic Jones) 2:26
"Rose of Allendale" (Nelson/Jeffreys(Roud #1218)/Arr. Nic Jones) 4:51
"Teddy Bears' Picnic" (Music by John W. Bratton) 2:19
"Thanksgiving" (Rick Lee) 2:39

Track 1, Seven Yellow Gypsies, was recorded from a BBC "Folk on 2" session on 1 March 1981. Track 3, Lord Franklin, was recorded from a concert in Italy in 1981.

References

Live folk albums
1990 albums
Nic Jones albums